Perfetti is an Italian surname. Notable people with the surname include:

 Augusto Perfetti, Italian billionaire businessman 
 Charles Perfetti, American psychologist
 Chris Perfetti, American actor
 Cole Perfetti (born 2002), Canadian ice hockey player
 Flora Perfetti (born 1969), Italian tennis player
 Giorgio Perfetti, Italian billionaire businessman

See also
 Perfetti Van Melle, company

Italian-language surnames